The Chariot (VII) is the seventh trump or Major Arcana card in most traditional tarot decks. It is used in game playing as well as in divination.

Description
A figure sits in a chariot, although he holds no rope, he is pulled by two sphinxes or horses. There is often a black and white motif, for example one of the steeds may be black and the other white. The figure may be crowned or helmeted, and is winged in some representations. The figure may hold a sword or wand. The Thoth Tarot deck has the figure controlling four animals.

The mallet, or gavel, on the chariot's coat of arms is a masonic symbol representing self control.

A canopy of stars above the charioteer's head is intended to show "celestial influences".

Interpretation
According to A.E. Waite's 1910 book Pictorial Key to the Tarot, the Chariot card carries several divinatory associations:

7. THE CHARIOT.—Succour, providence; also war, triumph, presumption, vengeance, trouble. Reversed: Riot, quarrel, dispute, litigation, defeat.

In other media
In the manga JoJo's Bizarre Adventure tarot cards are used to name the character's powers, 'Stands' one of the Stardust Crusaders, Jean Pierre Polnareff, has a stand named named Silver Chariot, named after the tarot card.

Alternative decks
Other names for the card are The Centurion or Victory.

References

External links
 

Chariot, The